Schistes is a genus of hummingbirds in the family Trochilidae. It was long considered to have only one species, the wedge-billed hummingbird but this species was split. The genus now includes two species:

References

 
Bird genera
Taxonomy articles created by Polbot